Rhinacanthus nasutus, commonly known as snake jasmine, is a plant native to tropical Asia and the western Indian Ocean. It is a slender, erect, branched, somewhat hairy shrub 1–2 m in height. The leaves are oblong, 4–10 cm in length, and narrowed and pointed at both ends. The inflorescence is a spreading, leafy, hairy panicle with the flowers usually in clusters. The calyx is green, hairy, and about 5 mm long. The corolla-tube is greenish, slender, cylindric, and about 2 cm long. The flowers is 2-lipped; the upper lip is white, erect, oblong or lancelike, 2-toothed at the apex, and about 3 mm in both length and width; and the lower lip is broadly obovate, 1.1-1.3 cm in both measurements, 3-lobed, and white, with a few, minute, brownish dots near the base. The fruit (capsule) is club-shaped and contains 4 seeds.

Uses
It has been used in the treatment of snake bites.

References

nasutus
Flora of tropical Asia
Flora of Madagascar
Flora of the Comoros